Bodymind is an approach to understand the relationship between the human body and mind where they are seen as a single integrated unit. It attempts to address the mind–body problem and resists the Western traditions of mind–body dualism. The term bodymind is also typically seen and encountered in disability studies, referring to the intricate and often inseparable relationship between the body and the mind, and how these two units might act as one. The field of psychosomatic medicine investigates the embodied manifestations of psychological processes.

Dualism vs holism 
In the field of philosophy, the theory of dualism is the speculation that the mental and the physical parts of us, like our minds and our bodies, are different or separate. Holism is the idea or speculation that all the properties of a system- such as the system of our thoughts, and the system of our body- cannot be determined or explained by looking at its components individually. Rather, the whole system looked at a complete whole is a determiner in understanding and viewing the idea, concept, or theory being questioned.

On the Western side of the globe, popular culture tends to be more on the side that there are two centers of our being that makes us who we are and how we see and interact with the world. The first is the mind – the center of our thoughts, and the heart (or body) – which is the center of our feelings. In Western culture, there is more of a debate on whether these different parts that make us unique are separate or connected.

In Eastern culture, especially in areas such as surrounding India and the Middle East, the idea of body-mind is the exact opposite. The words "mind" and "heart" both translate into "chitta", which refers to the mind. "Chitta" is one of the three overlapping terms used that refers to the mind. The other two are "manas" and  "viññāṇa". Together, they are parts that make up the whole or entirety of our minds, and our mental processes as a whole. Often used in practices such as yoga, commonly used and followed in more "self-help" medicines, in the Indian model, this heart-mind has three aspects: the capability of paying attention and sensory processing, the creation of our identity or self-image (more commonly known as Ego), and the capacity to imagine things, form judgements, and making decisions.

Historical background 
An important figure in the concept and belief of body-mind is an American philosopher, scholar, and professor of philosophy, religion, and culture, William H. Poteat (19 April 1919 – 17 May 2000). Throughout the course of his lifetime, Poteat was known for his contributions to post-critical philosophy and for being the leader of formative and influential ideas such as "bodymind". It is said he identified himself as a "practicing dialectician". He was known to encourage and challenge not only himself, but those around him, to question, understand, and challenge the reasoning and facts of the confusing aspects of modern life. Poteat drew his inspirations and ideas from Michael Polanyi, who wrote "The Stability of Beliefs" in 1952. In this essay, Polanyi spoke about how there are two ways of holding beliefs. He stated, "Some are held by the explicit profession of certain articles of faith, as the Apostles' Creed when recited in the words of the Book of Common Prayer. The other form of belief is held implicitly by reliance on a particular conceptual framework by which all experience is interpreted." Other influential people Poteat looked to for further inspiration were the Danish philosopher Søren Kierkegaard (1813–1855), a man considered to be the first existential philosopher (philosophy that emphasizes individual existence, freedom, and choice), the Austrian-British philosopher Ludwig Wittgenstein (1889–1951), the French philosopher Maurice Merleau-Ponty (1908–1961), and Hannah Arendt (1906–1975), a German-American philosopher and political theorist and many others. Together, these people and their ideas, along with Poteat's own ideas and theories, helped him further understand and share the concept and ideas of what bodymind is in the 21st century.

Religion 
The approach to bodymind is believed in and viewed through multiple faiths and practices.

Buddhism 
In Buddhism, the concept of bodymind, otherwise known as namarupa, is key. Another similarity that all the different branches of Buddhism share is the daily practice of "śīla", "samādhi", and "prajñā". The idea and practice of Buddhism originated in India, and is now practiced throughout the world. The core teachings of Buddhism are the Three Universal Truths, the Four Noble Truths, and the Noble Eightfold Path. Buddhism is one of the main ways in which we can view and more fully understand the bodymind approach- especially in today's modern world of many different advancements, ideas, and beliefs.

Modern understanding 
"The mind is composed of mental fragments- sensations, feelings, thoughts, imaginations, all flowing now in an ordered sequence, now in a chaotic fashion…. On the other hand, the body is constructed under the underlying laws of physics, and its components obey the well-enumerated laws of physiology. It is these characteristic differences between these two – between mind and body – that lead to the Mind-Body problem." There is still no concrete evidence if the mind has more impact on who we are, or of our bodies do. While the Western population tends to believe more in the idea of dualism, there is no reason to not believe the idea of holism. Many throughout the world who try to understand and live the idea of holism, say they feel more connected with themselves, with the environment, and with those around them. If anything, bodymind shows the significance of connected everything is- both in and outside ourselves. Bodymind is brought up in many different situations today in the modern world- especially in modern and alternative medicines.

Relevance to alternative medicine
In the field of alternative medicine, bodymind implies that 
 The body, mind, emotions, and spirit are dynamically interrelated.
 Experience, including physical stress, emotional injury, and pleasures are stored in the body's cells which in turn affects one's reactions to stimuli.
The term can be a number of disciplines, including:
 Psychoneuroimmunology, the study of the interaction between psychological processes and the nervous and immune systems of the human body.
 Body psychotherapy, a branch of psychotherapy which applies basic principles of somatic psychology. It originated in the work of Pierre Janet, Sigmund Freud and particularly Wilhelm Reich.
 Neurobiology, the study of the nervous system
 Bodymind (in meditation traditions).
 Namarupa the concept of mind and body in Buddhism.
 Psychosomatic medicine, an interdisciplinary medical field exploring the relationships among social, psychological, and behavioral factors on bodily processes and quality of life in humans and animals. Clinical situations where mental processes act as a major factor affecting medical outcomes are areas where psychosomatic medicine excels.
 Postural Integration, a process-oriented body psychotherapy originally developed in the late 1960s by Jack Painter (1933–2010) in California, USA, after exploration in the fields of humanistic psychology and the human potential movement. The method aims to support personal change and self development, through a particular form of manipulative holistic bodywork.
The term overlaps in significant ways, especially in its anti-dualist intention, with the philosophical term mindbody developed independently by philosopher William H. Poteat.

Relevance to disability studies 
The term bodymind is most generally used in the academic field of disability studies. Disability scholars use the term bodymind to emphasize the interdependence and inseparability of the body and mind. Disability studies scholars who have written academically about the bodymind include Eli Clare, Margaret Price, Sami Schalk, Alyson Patsavas, and Alison Kafer. Clare and Price have proposed that the bodymind expresses the interrelatedness of mental and physical processes, and Schalk defines the bodymind similarly as it pertains to disability and race.

See also 
 Ableism
 Bodymind (disability studies)
 Developmental disability
 Disability
 Disability and religion
 Disability culture
 Disability in the United States
 Disability rights
 Disability studies
 Emotional or behavioral disability
 Inclusion (disability rights)
 Invisible disability
 List of disability studies journals
 Medical model of disability
 Services for the disabled
 Sexuality and disability
 Social model of disability
 Society for Disability Studies

References

Further reading 
 Benson MD, Herbert; ( 2000) (1975),  The Relaxation Response, Harper  
 Bracken, Patrick & Philip Thomas; (2002), "Time to move beyond the mind-body split", editorial, British Medical Journal 2002;325:1433–1434 (21 December)
 Dychtwald, Ken; (1986),  Bodymind  Penguin Putman Inc. NY, 
 Gallagher, Shaun; (2005) ‚  How the Body Shapes the Mind  Oxford: Oxford University Press. 
 Hill, Daniel (2015) Affect Regulation Theory. A Clinical Model W. W. Norton.& Co .
 Keinänen, Matti;  (2005), Psychosemiosis as a Key to Body-Mind Continuum: The Reinforcement of Symbolization-Reflectiveness in Psychotherapy. Nova Science Publishers. .
 Mayer, Emeran A. 2003. The Neurobiology Basis of Mind Body Medicine: Convergent Traditional and Scientific Approaches to Health, Disease, and Healing.  Source: https://web.archive.org/web/20070403123225/http://www.aboutibs.org/Publications/MindBody.html (accessed: Sunday January 14, 2007).
 Money, John; (1988)  Gay, Straight, and In-Between: The Sexology of Erotic Orientation. New York: Oxford University Press. 
 Rothschild, Babette; ( 2000) The Body Remembers:  The Psychophysiology of Trauma and Trauma Treatment. W W Norton & Co Inc.
 Scheper-Hughes, Nancy, and Margaret M. Lock; (1987) The Mindful Body: A Prolegomenon to Future Work in Medical Anthropology with Margaret Lock. Medical Anthropology Quarterly. (1): 6–41.
 Seem, Mark & Kaplan, Joan; (1987) Bodymind Energetics, Towards a Dynamic Model of Health Healing Arts Press, Rochester VT, 
 Clare, Eli. "Brilliant Imperfection: Grappling with Cure"
 Schalk, Sami. "Bodyminds Reimagined: (Dis)ability, Race, and Gender in Black Women's Speculative Fiction"
 Patsavas, Alyson. "Recovering a Cripistemology of Pain: Leaky Bodies, Connective Tissue, and Feeling Discourse"
 Price, Margaret. "The Bodymind Problem and the Possibilities of Pain"
 Kafer, Alison. "Feminist, Queer, Crip"
Hall, Kim. "Gender" chapter from "Keywords for Disability Studies".
McRuer, Robert, and Johnson, Merri Lisa. "Proliferating Cripistemologies: A Virtual Roundtable".
Garland-Thomson, Rosemarie. "Extraordinary Bodies: Figuring Physical Disability in American Culture and Literature". 
Garland-Thomson, Rosemarie. "Becoming Disabled".

Body psychotherapy
Popular psychology
Dichotomies